Fearne Ewart (born 20 November 1936) is a British former swimmer. She competed in two events at the 1956 Summer Olympics.

She also represented England and won a bronze medal in the 440 yards freestyle relay at the 1954 British Empire and Commonwealth Games in Vancouver, Canada. She won the 1955 ASA National Championship 100 metres freestyle title.

References

1936 births
Living people
British female swimmers
Olympic swimmers of Great Britain
Swimmers at the 1956 Summer Olympics
Place of birth missing (living people)
Commonwealth Games medallists in swimming
Commonwealth Games bronze medallists for England
Swimmers at the 1954 British Empire and Commonwealth Games
20th-century British women
Medallists at the 1954 British Empire and Commonwealth Games